The 2019 Bolton Metropolitan Borough Council election took place on 2 May 2019 to elect members of Bolton Council in Greater Manchester, England. This was on the same day as other local elections. The Labour Party, which had run the council since 2006 and had maintained a majority since 2011, lost overall control of the Council.

20 seats were contested and the Labour Party won 6 seats, the Conservative Party won 6 seats, the Liberal Democrats won 3 seats, Farnworth and Kearsley First won 2 seats, Horwich and Blackrod First won 2 seat, and UKIP won 1 seat.

After the election, the total composition of the council was as follows:
Labour 24
Conservative 20
Liberal Democrats 6
Farnworth and Kearsley First 5
UK Independence Party 3
Horwich and Blackrod First 2

The Conservatives formed an agreement with all the other opposition parties, the Liberal Democrats, Farnworth and Kearsley First, UKIP and Horwich and Blackrod First in order to form a minority administration. For the first time since the period between 2004 and 2006, the Labour Party went into opposition. This was also the first time in history at Bolton Council that the party with the largest number of seats was not in charge of running the council.

Election results

Council composition
Prior to the election the composition of the council was:

After the election the composition of the council was:

LD - Liberal Democrats
U - UKIP
IND - Independent (politician

Ward results
Winning candidates are highlighted in bold.

Astley Bridge ward

Bradshaw ward

Breightmet ward

Bromley Cross ward

Crompton ward

Farnworth ward

Great Lever ward

Halliwell ward

Harper Green ward

Heaton and Lostock ward

Horwich and Blackrod ward

Horwich North East ward

Hulton ward

Kearsley ward

Little Lever and Darcy Lever ward

Rumworth ward

Smithills ward

Tonge with The Haulgh ward

Westhoughton North and Chew Moor ward

Westhoughton South ward

References

2019 English local elections
2019
2010s in Greater Manchester
May 2019 events in the United Kingdom